Ragıp or Ragip may refer to:

 Ragıp Başdağ (born 1978), Turkish footballer
 Ragıp Gümüşpala (1897–1964), Turkish military officer and politician
 Ragip Jashari (1961–1999), Albanian politician
 Ragıp Zarakolu (born 1948), Turkish human rights activist
 Koca Ragıp Pasha (1698–1763), Ottoman statesman and Grand Vizier

Turkish masculine given names